The 2016 Boston Marathon was the 120th running of the Boston Athletic Association's mass-participation marathon. It took place on Monday, April 18 (Patriots' Day in Massachusetts). Both of the winners were from Ethiopia: the men's race was won by Lemi Berhanu Hayle in a time of 2:12:45. Atsede Baysa  won the women's race with a time of 2:29:19.

Course

The event ran along the same winding course the Marathon has followed for many decades 26miles 385yards (42.195 km) of roads and city streets, starting in Hopkinton and passing through six Massachusetts cities and towns, to the finish line beside the Boston Public Library, on Boylston Street in Boston's Copley Square.

Over 30,000 valid entries were submitted, with an approximate total of 27,500 runners starting the race. All 50 US states were represented at the marathon, as well as several U.S territories, including Guam, Puerto Rico, and the U.S Virgin Islands.

The race was broadcast live on WBZ-TV in Boston and on NBC Sports in the rest of the United States.

Race summary

Race day was sunny and warm, with temperatures around 70 F (21 C) and a little wind. Security was extensive, with police from several towns and national guard patrolling along the course.

Women
Defending women's champion Caroline Rotich entered but did not complete the race, withdrawing after .

Men
Lelisa Desisa, who won Boston in 2013 and 2015, and 21-year-old Lemi Berhanu Hayle led the men's field for most of the race. Yemane Tsegay came in third, completing a podium sweep for Ethiopia.

Wheelchair
In the wheelchair races, Marcel Hug won his second Boston Marathon in a three-way finish with ten-time winner Ernst van Dyk and Kurt Fearnley. Tatyana McFadden won her fourth successive title, a full minute ahead of Manuela Schär and 2015 runner-up Wakako Tsuchida.

Results
Official results from the Boston Athletic Association:

Wheelchair

References

External links

 Official website
 

Boston Marathon
Marathon
Boston Marathon
Boston
Boston Marathon
Boston Marathon